Watch Croft is a prominent hill,  high overlooking the north coast of the Cornwall, UK. Its prominence of 225 metres qualifies it as a Marilyn, one of only five in Cornwall. The others are Brown Willy (420 m), Kit Hill (334 m), Hensbarrow Beacon (312 m) and Carnmenellis (252 m). It is the highest point in West Penwith.

Watch Croft is located within an Area of Outstanding Natural Beauty and the St Just Mining District World Heritage Site, on the White Downs in the Cornish region of West Penwith, 7 kilometres WNW of Penzance, about 7½ kilometres northeast of St. Just and about a kilometre from the north Cornish coastline. The summit is a rock tor. There are views across Mount's Bay to the Lizard, south to Ding Dong Mine and north to Pendeen Watch.

References 

Hills of Cornwall
Marilyns of Cornwall
Penwith